is a female Japanese voice actress primarily for visual novels.

Filmography

Visual novels
 Auau (2003), Momo
 Angelium ~Tokimeki Lovegod~ (2003), Chadoko
 Patishia na Nyanko (2003), Kanade Serizawa
 Pizzicato Polka (2003), Niko
 Yami to Bōshi to Hon no Tabibito (2003), Mau and Marieru
 Saishū Jiken Kujara (2004), Haruko Yumezen
 Sorauta (2004), China Sakura
 Ramune (2004), Suzuna Tomosaka
 Otome wa Boku ni Koishiteru (2005), Mizuho Miyanokōji and Michiko Takane
 Dyogrammaton (2005), Iryūda Wakanowa Ivanofu
 Nursery Rhyme (2005), Haruna Tachigawa
 Oshiete Re: Maid (2006), Yunisu
 Scarlett (2006), Teresa, Lucia, Suzuna, and Kanna
 Yokubari Saboten (2006), Rin Fujimiya
 Baldr Sky part 1 & 2 (2009), Makoto Minaduki
 Sei Monmusu Gakuen (2012), Mirita H Asukurepio

Anime
 Izumo (2003 OVA), Miyuki Toma 
 Angelium (2004 OVA), Cyadoko Asagiri

References

External links

Japanese voice actresses
Living people
Year of birth missing (living people)